The 2020–21 NBL season was the 49th edition of the English Men's National Basketball League.

It was announced that there would be no promotion or relegation following the 2020–21 season, due to the ongoing impact of the COVID-19 pandemic. The NBL2 and NBL3 seasons were indefinitely suspended, later cancelled, and the NBL1 season structure was revised into regionalised schedules, due to the ongoing situation presented by the pandemic.

NBL Division 1

Team changes
Promoted from NBL Division 2
 Team Newcastle
 Essex Rebels

Relegated to NBL Division 2
 Liverpool
 Westminster Warriors

Team changes
 Essex & Herts Leopards to Oaklands Wolves
 Barking Abbey to BA London Lions

Teams

Regular season

Playoffs

First round

Quarter-finals

Semi-finals

Final

Awards

Statistics
Player of the Week Awards

Scoring
As of 18 April 2021 

Rebounding
As of 18 April 2021 

Assists
As of 18 April 2021

L Lynch Trophy
The 2020–21 L Lynch Trophy was the inaugural edition of the competition, organised by participating clubs to mark the return to play for men's basketball. 16 teams, the 14 NBL Division 1 sides and the Myerscough and Charnwood academy sides, were split into four regional groups. Each group was intended to play all games within one "bubble" venue. The top 2 sides from each group would advance to the quarter-finals, therein playing a knockout format to determine the overall winners.

Group stage

Group 1, Myerscough

Group 2, Oaklands

Group 3, Loughborough

Group 4, Solent

Quarter-finals

Semi-finals

Final

References

English Basketball League seasons
Basketball
Basketball
2020–21 in European second tier basketball leagues